National Heritage is a 1981 Spanish comedy film directed by Luis García Berlanga. It was entered into the 1981 Cannes Film Festival. The film was also selected as the Spanish entry for the Best Foreign Language Film at the 54th Academy Awards, but was not accepted as a nominee.

Cast
 Luis Ciges as Segundo
 Luis Escobar as Marqués de Leguineche
 Agustín González as Padre Calvo
 José Luis López Vázquez as Luis José
 Alfredo Mayo as Nacho
 José Lifante as Goyo (as José Ruiz Lifante)
 Mary Santpere as Condesa
 Amparo Soler Leal as Chus
 Syliane Stella as Solange
 José Luis de Vilallonga as Álvaro
 José Luis Alonso
 Patricio Arnáiz
 Pedro Beltrán
 Julio Castronuovo
 Jaime Chávarri

See also
 List of submissions to the 54th Academy Awards for Best Foreign Language Film
 List of Spanish submissions for the Academy Award for Best Foreign Language Film

References

External links

1981 films
Spanish comedy films
1980s Spanish-language films
1981 comedy films
Films directed by Luis García Berlanga
Films with screenplays by Rafael Azcona
1980s Spanish films